The Săcuieu (in its upper course also Valea Răchițele, in its lower course also Pârâul Hențu or Henț) is a left tributary of the river Crișul Repede in Romania. Its source is in the Apuseni Mountains. It discharges into the Crișul Repede near Bologa.

Tributaries

The following rivers are tributaries to the Săcuieu:

Left: Valea Stanciului, Seciu, Răcad, Aluniș, Vișag
Right: Mărgăuța

References

Rivers of Romania
Rivers of Cluj County